Karl-Heinz Heddergott (27 August 1926 – 27 May 2021) was a German professional football manager.

Career

Coaching career
An alumnus of German Sport University Cologne, he was a member of the German Football Association from 1967 to 1980. He was hired by the United States Soccer Federation (USSF) as the director of coaching in 1984. He also managed 1. FC Köln, Egypt and Oman.

References

1926 births
2021 deaths
Sportspeople from Düsseldorf
German football managers
1. FC Köln managers
Egypt national football team managers
Oman national football team managers
20th-century German people
21st-century German people
German expatriate sportspeople in Oman
West German expatriate football managers
West German football managers
West German expatriate sportspeople in Egypt
West German expatriate sportspeople in the United States
Expatriate football managers in Oman
Expatriate football managers in Egypt